Archibald Liversidge FRS FRSE FRSNSW LLD (17 November 1847 – 26 September 1927) was an English-born chemist and a co-founder of the Australasian Association for the Advancement of Science.

Early life

Liversidge was born at Turnham Green, Chiswick, England, the son of John Liversidge of Bexley and his wife Caroline Sophia, née Jarratt. Liversidge was educated at a private school and by private tutors in science, and in 1866 went to the Royal College of Chemistry and Royal School of Mines. In 1867 Liversidge won a Royal exhibition and medals in chemistry, mineralogy and metallurgy. Liversidge became an associate of the School of Mines and in 1870 was awarded an open scholarship in science at Christ's College, Cambridge. In 1870 Liversidge became a demonstrator of chemistry at the university laboratory.

Career in Australia

In 1872 Liversidge accepted the appointment of 'Reader in Geology and Assistant in the Laboratory' at the University of Sydney and began his duties there early in 1873. Liversidge became professor of geology and mineralogy in 1874, and in 1876 he published The Minerals of New South Wales, being a reprint of a paper read at the Royal Society of New South Wales in December 1874. A second and enlarged edition appeared in 1882 and a third edition in 1888. Edward Rennie was a pupil and the two men were in contact until Liversidge's death. In 1878 he visited the leading museums, universities and technical colleges of Europe, and by 1879 he had persuaded the senate to open a faculty of science. In 1880 his Report upon certain Museums for Technology, Science and Art, was published at Sydney. In this same year, Liversidge visited Europe as a trustee of the Australian Museum and his report helped to establish the Industrial, Technological and Sanitary Museum which formed the basis of the present Powerhouse Museum's collection. In 1881 the title of his chair was altered to chemistry and mineralogy, and in 1891 to chemistry only. Liversidge was dean of the faculty of science from its foundation in 1882 until 1904; he also founded the school of mines at the University in 1892. 

Liversidge was deeply involved in the Royal Society of New South Wales; he was honorary secretary from 1874 to 1884 and 1886–88, was its president in 1885, 1889 and 1900, and was for many years editor of the Society's Journal and Proceedings. In 1888 Liversidge, after much preliminary work, founded the Australasian Association for the Advancement of Science, was its honorary secretary from 1888 to 1909 and president in 1898. Liversidge was chairman of the original board of the Sydney technical museum, was a trustee of the Australian Museum at Sydney, and he founded the Sydney section of the Society of Chemical Industry in 1902. Liversidge resigned his professorship at Sydney in December 1907 and became emeritus professor. In 1909 Liversidge returned to England and became vice-president of the Society of Chemical Industry, 1909–12, and vice-president of the Chemical Society 1910–13. Liversidge then lived in retirement at Fieldhouse, Kingston Hill and died on 26 September 1927 from a heart attack. He was unmarried.

Legacy

In addition to the works mentioned above, Liversidge published for the use of students Tables for Qualitative Chemical Analysis (second edition 1903). He also wrote over 100 papers on chemistry and mineralogy for scientific journals, many of which were issued as pamphlets, and during his stay in Australia he was an untiring worker in the cause of science. Joseph Maiden, in his "History of the Royal Society of New South Wales", said of Liversidge that "he practically re-founded the Society, organized its activities on proper lines, and made it the power for good it is to-day". Liversidge laid the foundations of the Australasian Association for the Advancement of Science, was an honorary secretary for 21 years, and retained his interest in the association after his retirement to England. Liversidge was elected a fellow of the Royal Society, London, in 1882, was honorary fellow of the Royal Society of Edinburgh, and was given the honorary degree of LL.D. by Glasgow university. Under his will a sum of £2500 was left to the University of Sydney for scholarships and a research lectureship in chemistry.

The Faraday Division of the Royal Society of Chemistry issues a Liversidge Award, named in his honour.

Leptospermum liversidgei, a heath plant of eastern Australia, is named after Archibald Liversidge.

Notes

References

External links

1847 births
1927 deaths
People from Chiswick
English chemists
English geologists
Fellows of the Royal Society